DXCA (106.3 FM), broadcasting as 106.3 Bell FM, is a radio station owned and operated by Baganian Broadcasting Corporation. The station's studio is located at the 2nd Floor, BBC Bldg., Bana St., Brgy. Sta. Maria, Pagadian, and its transmitter is located in Mt. Pampalan, Pagadian.

References

Radio stations in Zamboanga del Sur
Radio stations established in 2000
2000 establishments in the Philippines